The 2016 SIU Edwardsville Cougars softball team represented Southern Illinois University Edwardsville (SIUE) during the 2016 NCAA Division I softball season. The Cougars, led by twenty-eighth year head coach Sandy Montgomery, played their home games at Cougar Field on the SIUE campus  as a member of the Ohio Valley Conference (OVC).

Preseason
Ten players returned from the 2015 squad that finished with a 43–16 overall record (20–6 in the OVC) and won the OVC regular season championship. They were joined by six freshmen and three transfer students, It was announced in the fall that the 2015 OVC Pitcher-of-the-Year Haley Chambers had left school for personal reasons.

The Cougars were picked by the coaches and sports information directors of the Ohio Valley Conference to finish fourth in the conference.

Regular season
The Cougars opened the season with their usual extended on-the-road schedule. They were 2–3 in the Florida Atlantic Kick-Off Classic in Boca Raton, Florida. At South Alabama's Mardi Gras Invitational in Mobile, Alabama, they were 1–3. In Spartanburg, South Carolina for USC Upstate's Spartan Invitational, they were 2–2. They also lost at South Carolina and two at Western Carolina before their home opener, a nine inning win over Drake. Three of their five remaining non-conference games, scheduled while also playing the OVC games. were cancelled due to weather; with a win versus UIC and a loss to Bradley.

In OVC play, SIUE went 15–11 (one game against Eastern Kentucky cancelled by thunderstorms) to finish in fourth place.

Postseason

Roster

Schedule

References

SIU Edwardsville
SIU Edwardsville Cougars softball seasons